Cymatella is a genus of fungus in the family Marasmiaceae. The genus contains four species found in the Antilles.

See also
List of Marasmiaceae genera

References

Marasmiaceae
Agaricales genera